Patrik Rikama-Hinnenberg (born 8 February 1983) is a Finnish football player. He formerly played for IFK Mariehamn, HJK, Atlantis FC, GIF Sundsvall and Etar 1924.

References

External links
 
 Guardian Football

1983 births
Living people
Finnish footballers
Helsingin Jalkapalloklubi players
IFK Mariehamn players
GIF Sundsvall players
FC Etar 1924 Veliko Tarnovo players
Veikkausliiga players
Allsvenskan players
Superettan players
First Professional Football League (Bulgaria) players
Expatriate footballers in Sweden
Expatriate footballers in Bulgaria
Finnish expatriate footballers
Finnish expatriate sportspeople in Sweden
Finnish expatriate sportspeople in Bulgaria
Association football defenders
Sportspeople from Vantaa